Rinu Razak is an Indian playback singer. She has performed songs for films such as Ohm Shanti Oshana, Praise The Lord, Ormayundo Ee Mugham, Vettah, and Theeram.

Career 
Rinu Razak has associated with several music composers such as Shaan Rahman, Gopi Sundar, Armaan Malik, and Afzal Yusuf. In 2014, she debuted in playback singing with her songs "Mounam Chorum Neram" and "Sneham Cherum Neram" for the Malayalam movie Ohm Shanthi Oshaana. She had various soundtracks to her name such as "Sharon Vaniyil" (Praise the Lord), "Doore Doore" (Ormayundo Ee Mukham) and "Raavu Maayave" (Vettah).

In 2017, Rinu Razak debuted as a lyricist by writing the lyrics of 'Njan Varumee' for the movie Theeram. 

She was the title-winner of the Reality Show 'Super Star Junior 2010' of Amrita TV and also the 'First Runner-up' of Media One TV's 'Pathinaaalam Ravu: Season One'.

Personal life 
Rinu Razak is originally from Manjeri. She is currently pursuing her Master's in English at The English and Foreign Languages University (EFLU).

Discography

References

External links

https://m.timesofindia.com/entertainment/events/hyderabad/malayalam-singing-star-stirs-up-a-musical-storm-at-eflu/amp_articleshow/68081434.cms
http://m.timesofindia.com/entertainment/malayalam/music/I-am-humbled-that-my-voice-has-been-recognised-as-a-unique-one-Rinu-Razak/articleshow/45296088.cms
http://english.manoramaonline.com/entertainment/interview/rinu-razak-on-singing-and-on-work-front.html

1996 births
Living people